Christopher Lynn Boswell (born March 16, 1991) is an American football placekicker for the Pittsburgh Steelers of the National Football League (NFL). He played college football at Rice and was signed by the Houston Texans in 2014 as an undrafted free agent and has also spent time with the New York Giants.

Early years
Boswell attended and played high school football at Fossil Ridge High School. He received offers from Rice, Baylor, Kansas State, North Texas, Missouri, Texas A&M, and Texas Tech before committing to play college football at Rice. His father had grown up in Brazil, playing street soccer. He taught his son the rabona, a trick he would go on to use in American football.

College career
Boswell was a three-year starter at Rice. With 358 career points, he is second on the all-time Rice scoring list behind ex-NFL wide receiver Jarett Dillard. While at Rice, Boswell was a member of Martel College.

Professional career

Houston Texans
The Houston Texans signed Boswell on May 10, 2014 to compete with Randy Bullock. Boswell was cut on August 29. He was re-signed to the practice squad on September 23, 2014.

New York Giants
On January 7, 2015, Boswell signed a reserve/future contract with the New York Giants. On August 16, 2015, Boswell was waived by the Giants. On September 2, 2015, he was re-signed by the Giants. On September 5, 2015, Boswell was waived after failing to make the final 53-man roster.

Pittsburgh Steelers

2015 season 
Boswell signed with the Pittsburgh Steelers on October 3, 2015, becoming their fourth placekicker in 2015.

Boswell made his NFL debut on October 12, completing all three of his extra points and making a 47-yard field goal attempt in a victory over the San Diego Chargers. He connected on the longest debut conversion in team history, besting Todd Peterson’s record of 46. On October 18, the following week against the Arizona Cardinals, Boswell was 4-for-4 on field goals including kicks of 48, 49, and 51 yards, earning him AFC Special Teams Player of the Week honors. He is the first Steeler in team history to make three 47+ yard field goals in one game. On November 8, Boswell kicked three field goals, including the game-winner and three PATs against the Oakland Raiders, albeit missing his first field goal season-to-date. On November 15, Boswell kicked three field goals against the Cleveland Browns. His 14 field goals is tied for fourth among rookie/first-year players in team history, just behind Jeff Reed (2002, 17). On November 29, Boswell kicked three field goals against the Seattle Seahawks. On October 25, Boswell kicked two field goals against the Kansas City Chiefs. On December 6, Boswell kicked three field goals against the Indianapolis Colts. On December 13, Boswell kicked four field goals against the Cincinnati Bengals. On December 20, Boswell kicked two field goals against the Denver Broncos. He tied a franchise record for the most consecutive games played while scoring at least 10 points, tied with Gary Anderson (1985). He also passed Kris Brown for the most made field goals by a rookie or first-year player in the history of the franchise with 29. He also set Steelers’ records for rookie/first-year kickers for points in a season with 113 and field goal percentage at 90.6. On January 7, 2016, Boswell won AFC Special Teams Player of the Month for the month of December.

On January 9, 2016, Boswell kicked four field goals in an 18–16 win in the AFC wild card game against the Cincinnati Bengals. He successfully kicked a 35-yard game-winning field goal with less than 20 seconds remaining in the game. He set an NFL record for the most field goals by a rookie/first-year player in a playoff game. His four field goals also tied for the most in Steelers playoff history (Gary Anderson in the 1989 Wild Card Round). He also became the youngest kicker to make four field goals in a postseason game. On January 17, 2016, in a loss against the Denver Broncos during the Divisional Round of the playoffs, Boswell tied a franchise record with seven total field goals completed in the post-season.

2016 season 
On September 18, Boswell kicked a season-long 49-yard field goal against the Cincinnati Bengals. On October 23, Boswell kicked three field goals but missed two against the New England Patriots. On November 20, Boswell kicked three field goals against the Cleveland Browns. On December 11, Boswell kicked two field goals against the Buffalo Bills. On December 18, Boswell kicked a career-high six field goals against the Cincinnati Bengals. He is the first kicker in NFL history to convert at least six field goals in a game and have five of those connect from 40+ yards. The last kicker to kick five field goals from 40+ yards in the same game was Mason Crosby in 2015. He is the third Pittsburgh Steeler in franchise history to accomplish the feat. (Jeff Reed in 2002 and Gary Anderson twice in 1988). On January 15, 2017, In the divisional playoff, he set a playoff record, kicking 6 field goals leading the team to beat the Kansas City Chiefs 18–16, scoring all of the Steelers' points. Boswell's four first-half field goals also tied the team record for an entire playoff game.

2017 season 
On February 2, 2017, the Steelers signed Boswell to a one-year, exclusive-rights contract. During a Week 2 26-9 victory over the Minnesota Vikings, Boswell converted four field goals and two extra points. During a Week 7 19-14 victory over the Cincinnati Bengals, he kicked a season-high five field goals. In Week 11, he kicked four field goals in a 40-17 victory over the Tennessee Titans. Boswell made a game-winning 53-yard field goal in the next game to beat the Green Bay Packers 31-28 as time expired. His game-winner set a new career-long and tied kicker Dan Bailey's record set in 2016 for the longest NFL field goal ever kicked at Heinz Field (53 yards) in its 17-year history. The only longer successful attempt was in collegiate play when former Old Dominion kicker Jarod Brown made a 54-yard kick against the Pitt Panthers in 2013. The following week, Boswell converted both extra points and all three field goal attempts, including a 38-yard game-winner as time expired, in a 23–20 comeback win over the Bengals, earning him AFC Special Teams Player of the Week. During a narrow Week 14 39-38 victory over the Baltimore Ravens, he kicked four field goals, including a game-winner. Throughout the season, Boswell has kicked multiple game-winning field goals in the last minutes, earning him status as one of the Steelers' "Killer B's" and a spot on the AFC's Pro Bowl starting roster. He finished the season tied with Harrison Butker for fourth in scoring with 142 points.

2018 season
On March 12, 2018, the Steelers placed a second-round restricted free-agent tender on Boswell. On April 5, he signed the tender. On August 23, 2018, the Steelers signed Boswell to a new five-year deal, keeping him under contract through the 2022 season. Boswell was later named a captain alongside Ben Roethlisberger, Maurkice Pouncey, and Cameron Heyward.

Boswell had a down year in 2018, converting only 13 of 20 field goal attempts and 43 of 48 extra point attempts. His 65% field goal percentage was ranked last among kickers with at least 20 field goal attempts. During a Week 12 24-17 road loss to the 2018 Denver Broncos, Boswell scored his first NFL touchdown on a fake field goal in the waning moments of the second quarter, tossing a two-yard pass to offensive tackle Alejandro Villanueva as time expired. He would then convert the ensuing extra point, thus accounting for all seven points of the score.

Boswell was placed on injured reserve on December 28, 2018. It was revealed that he suffered a grade-2 tear in his groin as reported by his brother, Stephen Boswell. Boswell was replaced by kicker Matt McCrane for the Steelers' final game against the Cincinnati Bengals for the 2018 season.

2019 season
Boswell rebounded in 2019, going 29 for 31 (93.5%) on field goal attempts and a perfect 28 for 28 on extra point attempts.

2020 season
On November 8, 2020, in a game at AT&T Stadium against the Dallas Cowboys, Boswell made a career-long 59-yard field goal which also set the Steelers franchise record for the longest field goal.

2021 season
In the fourth quarter of the Steelers' September 19 game against the Las Vegas Raiders, Boswell broke the Heinz Field field goal record with a 56-yard field goal. On October 17, 2021, he hit three field goals against the Seattle Seahawks including a 37-yard game-winning field goal in overtime. On October 31, 2021, against the Cleveland Browns, Boswell was concussed on a fake field goal attempt. The ball was snapped to him, he rolled out right while attempting to pass, and was hit immediately after throwing the ball, which landed incomplete. On November 8, 2021, against the Chicago Bears, Boswell missed a PAT in the third quarter, but was 3 for 3 on field goals, hitting a 54-yarder, a 52-yarder, and a game-winning 40-yarder.

2022 season
On August 1, 2022, Boswell signed a four-year, $20 million contract extension with the Steelers.

During the season-opener at the Cincinnati Bengals, Boswell missed a 55-yard field goal that would have won the game in overtime which hit the left upright. However, he would go on to kick a 53-yard game-winning field goal, converting on three of four field goal attempts in that game. Three weeks later, Boswell made a 59-yard field goal against the New York Jets as time expired in the second quarter, making it the longest field goal scored at Acrisure Stadium to date, and tying his career-long. On November 10, 2022, he was placed on injured reserve with a groin injury. He was activated on December 10.

NFL career statistics

Regular season

|-
! style="text-align:center;"| 2015
! style="text-align:center;"| PIT
| 12 || 29 || 32 || 90.6% || 0 || 51 || 26 || 27 || 96.3% || 74 || 63.2 || 26 || 113
|-
! style="text-align:center;"| 2016
! style="text-align:center;"| PIT
| 15 || 21 || 25 || 84.0% || 1 || 49 || 36 || 36 || 100.0% || 80 || 61.9 || 49 || 99
|-
! style="text-align:center;"| 2017
! style="text-align:center;"| PIT
| 16 || 35 || 38 || 92.1% || 1 || 53 || 37 || 39 || 94.9% || 90 || 63.1 || 46 || 142
|-
! style="text-align:center;"| 2018
! style="text-align:center;"| PIT
| 15 || 13 || 20 || 65.0% || 0 || 50 || 43 || 48 || 89.6% || 81 || 62.9 || 50 || 82
|-
! style="text-align:center;"| 2019
! style="text-align:center;"| PIT
| 16 || 29 || 31 || 93.5% || 0 || 51 || 28 || 28 || 100.0% || 72 || 63.2 || 31 || 115
|-
! style="text-align:center;"| 2020
! style="text-align:center;"| PIT
| 13 || 19 || 20 || 95.0% || 0 || 59 || 34 || 38 || 89.5% || 73 || 63.3 || 44 || 91
|-
! style="text-align:center;"| 2021
! style="text-align:center;"| PIT
| 17 || 36 || 40 || 90.0% || 0 || 56 || 27 || 29 || 93.1% || 86 || 63.5 || 40 || 135
|-
! style="text-align:center;"| 2022
! style="text-align:center;"| PIT
| 12 || 20 || 28 || 71.4% || 1 || 59 || 18 || 18 || 100.0% || 50 || 61.5 || 21 || 78
|- class="sortbottom"
! colspan="2"| Career || 116 || 202 || 234 || 86.3% || 3 || 59 || 249 || 263 || 94.7% || 606 || 62.9 || 307 || 855
|}

Postseason

|-
! style="text-align:center;"| 2015
! style="text-align:center;"| PIT
| 2 || 7 || 7 || 100.0% || 0 || 47 || 1 || 1 || 100.0% || 11 || 62.2 || 8 || 22
|-
! style="text-align:center;"| 2016
! style="text-align:center;"| PIT
| 3 || 8 || 8 || 100.0% || 0 || 45 || 3 || 5 || 60.0% || 17 || 59.2 || 6 || 27
|-
! style="text-align:center;"| 2017
! style="text-align:center;"| PIT
| 1 || 0 || 0 || 0.0% || 0 || - || 6 || 6 || 100.0% || 7 || 52.4 || 3 || 6
|-
! style="text-align:center;"| 2020
! style="text-align:center;"| PIT
| 1 || 1 || 1 || 100.0% || 0 || 49 || 2 || 2 || 100.0% || 6 || 54.2 || 2 || 5
|-
! style="text-align:center;"| 2021
! style="text-align:center;"| PIT
| 1 || 0 || 0 || 0.0% || 0 || - || 3 || 3 || 100.0% || 4 || 51.0 || 1 || 3
|- class="sortbottom"
! colspan="2"| Career || 8 || 16 || 16 || 100.0% || 0 || 49 || 15 || 17 || 88.2% || 45 || 57.5 || 20 || 63
|}

References

External links
 Pittsburgh Steelers bio
 Rice Owls bio
 

1991 births
Living people
Players of American football from Fort Worth, Texas
Rice Owls football players
Houston Texans players
New York Giants players
Pittsburgh Steelers players
American football placekickers
American Conference Pro Bowl players